James Edgar Robinson (15 August 1868, near Marysville, Ohio – 27 January 1932) was an American lawyer who served as an Associate Justice of the Ohio Supreme Court from 1919 to 1932. He was the maternal grandfather of First Lady Barbara Bush and great-grandfather of President George W. Bush.

Life and career
Robinson was son of John W. Robinson (1831-1920, younger brother of James Wallace Robinson) and his wife Sarah Coe (1831-1901). Robinson was educated at the local high school and latter attended Ohio Wesleyan University 1886 to 1889, studied law with his uncle, and at Ohio State University College of Law from 1892 to 1893. At the latter he was a member of the first law class. He began the practice of law in Richwood, Ohio in 1893. At the turn of the century he was elected prosecuting attorney of Union County, he served in this capacity for six years. Robinson continued the practice of law until 1915, when Governor Willis appointed him an appellate judge in the Court of Appeals. In the 1916 election he was defeated in the Democratic landslide. In 1919 he was elected to the Supreme Court of Ohio. He was elected to a second term in 1925, and a third in 1930, but he died two years into the term.

Death
He died after a short illness, January 27, 1932. His funeral was at his home, with Robert R. Reed of the Indianola Presbyterian Church officiating. He was buried at the family cemetery in Marysville.

Family
Robinson married Lula Dell Flickinger on May 31, 1893. They had 4 children.

Robinson is a sixth cousin once removed of British Prime Minister Winston Churchill, and is an ancestor (maternal great grandfather) of President George W. Bush. His daughter, Pauline Robinson, was the mother of First Lady Barbara Pierce, and the mother-in-law of President George H. W. Bush.

References

External links

1868 births
1932 deaths
People from Marysville, Ohio
Judges of the Ohio District Courts of Appeals
Justices of the Ohio Supreme Court
County district attorneys in Ohio
Ohio Wesleyan University alumni
Ohio State University Moritz College of Law alumni
Ohio Republicans
People from Richwood, Ohio